The 2021 Thüringen Ladies Tour (known as the Internationale LOTTO Thüringen Ladies Tour for sponsorship reasons) was the 32nd edition of the Thüringen Ladies Tour, a women's road cycling stage race being held between 25 and 30 May 2021 in the state of Thuringia in central Germany. Given the cancellation of the 2020 edition, this edition was the first since its promotion after the 2019 season to a category 2.Pro event in the UCI Women's ProSeries.

Teams 
Six of the nine UCI Women's WorldTeams, six UCI Women's Continental Teams, three national teams, and two elite amateur domestic teams made up the seventeen teams that participated the race.

UCI Women's WorldTeams

 
 
 
 
 
 

UCI Women's Continental Teams

 
 
 
 
 
 

National Teams

 Belgium
 Germany
 Netherlands

Elite Amateur Domestic Teams

 Maxx–Solar Lindig
 RSG Gießen Biehle

Route

Stages

Stage 1 
25 May 2021 – Schmölln to Schmölln,

Stage 2 
26 May 2021 – Gera to Gera,

Stage 3 
27 May 2021 – Schleiz to Schleiz,

Stage 4 
28 May 2021 – Dörtendorf to Dörtendorf,

Stage 5 
29 May 2021 – Weimar to Weimar,

Stage 6 
30 May 2021 – Gotha to Gotha,

Classification leadership table 

 On stage 2, Anna Henderson, who was second in the sprints classification, wore the pink jersey, because first placed Emma Norsgaard Jørgensen wore the gold jersey as the leader of the general classification. For the same reason, Lorena Wiebes, who was second in the young rider classification, wore the red jersey, and Lucinda Brand, who finished second on stage 1, wore the black-and-white stage winner's jersey.
 On stage 3, Clara Copponi, who was third in the young rider classification, wore the red jersey, because first placed Emma Norsgaard Jørgensen wore the gold jersey as the leader of the general classification, and second placed Lorena Wiebes wore the black-and-white stage winner's jersey.
 On stage 3, Katharina Fox, who was third in the sprints classification, wore the pink jersey, because first placed Emma Norsgaard Jørgensen wore the gold jersey as the leader of the general classification and second placed Lotte Kopecky wore the Belgian national champion's jersey as the defending Belgian national road race champion. Because Fox was also the most active rider, Ella Harris, who was deemed the second most active rider on that stage, wore the blue-and-white jersey.
 On stage 4, Lucinda Brand, who was third in the sprints classification, wore the pink jersey, because first placed Emma Norsgaard Jørgensen wore the gold jersey as the leader of the general classification and second placed Lotte Kopecky wore the Belgian national champion's jersey as the defending Belgian national road race champion. As a result, Amy Pieters, who finished fourth on stage 3 behind Brand, Norsgaard Jørgensen, and Kopecky, wore the black-and-white stage winner's jersey.
 On stage 4, Léa Curinier, who was second in the young rider classification, wore the red jersey, because first placed Emma Norsgaard Jørgensen wore the gold jersey as the leader of the general classification.
 On stage 5, Liane Lippert, who was third on stage 4, wore the black-and-white stage winner's jersey, because first placed Lotte Kopecky wore the pink jersey as the leader of the sprints classification, and second placed Lucinda Brand wore the gold jersey as the leader of the general classification.
 On stage 6, Lorena Wiebes, who was fourth in the sprints classification, wore the pink jersey, because first placed Lucinda Brand wore the gold jersey as the leader of the general classification, second placed Emma Norsgaard Jørgensen wore the red jersey as the leader of the young rider classification, and third placed Lotte Kopecky wore the Belgian national champion's jersey as the defending Belgian national road race champion. Because Brand was also the winner of stage 5, while Wiebes and Norsgaard Jørgensen finished second and third, respectively, Alexis Ryan, who finished fourth on stage 5, wore the black-and-white stage winner's jersey.

Final classification standings

General classification

Sprints classification

Mountains classification

Young rider classification

Amateur rider classification

Team classification

See also 

 2021 in women's road cycling

Notes

References

External links 
 

Thüringen Ladies Tour
Thüringen Ladies Tour
2021
Thüringen Ladies Tour